Mohawk High School may refer to one of these high schools in the United States:

Mohawk High School (Sycamore, Ohio)
Mohawk High School (Marcola, Oregon)
Mohawk High School (Pennsylvania)